WAFI is a mixed-use development in Dubai, United Arab Emirates. The complex includes a mall, hotel, restaurants, residences, and a nightclub.  The "city" is styled after Ancient Egypt.  This themed environment includes columns reminiscent of Karnak, small pyramids, and images of pharaohs. The walls are the colour of the light brown stone that can be found on structures in Ancient Egypt.

Wafi Mall

The main feature of Wafi is the mall, called Wafi Mall. Opened in 1991, the mall includes over 200 stores. Wafi Mall features glass selected from mosques and temples across the Islamic world.

In 2007, many masked gunmen rammed two cars into some shops at the mall. They stole cash and diamonds. They were later found in Europe and sent back to Dubai.

Raffles Dubai

In November 2007, Raffles opened its first property in the Middle East.  Raffles Dubai is a 5-star hotel in a pyramidal shape that contains 248 rooms on 18 floors.  The standard room sizes, are the largest in Dubai. This building is positioned close to the Khan Murjan Souk Wafi.

Pyramids
The Pyramids is a complex that contains several restaurants, cafés, and spas, including Cleopatra's Spa and Pharaoh's Club.

Wafi Residence
Wafi Residence is a residential complex that opened in July 1995.  Residents have full membership to the spas in the Pyramids.

Transport
The nearest metro station is Dubai Healthcare City on the Green Line.

See also
 Dubai Healthcare City

References

External links

 WAFI official website
 Shopping Malls and Centers in Dubai — TEN Yellow Pages

1995 establishments in the United Arab Emirates
Buildings and structures in Dubai
Shopping malls established in 2001
Shopping malls in Dubai